The Postal Museum is a museum located in Zhongzheng District, Taipei, Taiwan. The museum encompasses seven floors and covers postal history, modern postal service, philately, and special exhibitions.

History
The museum opened at a location in Xindian Township, Taipei County on 20 March 1966, on the 70th anniversary of Chunghwa Post. Due to remoteness of the Xindian location and the lack of space, the museum was moved to its present location in the Nanhai Academy in 1984.

Features
The museum contains exhibitions about postal history and stamps, the modern postal service, as well as a special exhibition, a library, and a auditorium.

Architecture
The museums spans over 10 floors.

Transportation
The museum is within walking distance of the Chiang Kai-shek Memorial Hall Station of the Taipei Metro.

See also
 List of museums in Taiwan
 Chunghwa Post

References

External links

Postal Museum in English

1966 establishments in Taiwan
Museums in Taipei
Museums established in 1966
Postal museums
Postal system of Taiwan
Relocated buildings and structures in Taiwan